Paul Antoine Bien-Aimé was Minister of Interior and Territorial Collectivities of Haiti. He was appointed to the Cabinet by Jacques-Édouard Alexis on June 6, 2006. The appointment was approved by the Senate on the 7th and Bien-Aimé was sworn in on the 9th.

Bien-Aimé retained his post after Alexis resigned from the post of Prime Minister in 2008.

References

Year of birth missing (living people)
Living people
Haitian Interior Ministers